Parachalcerinys is a genus of wasp. , three species are recognized, which are all found in Australia.

References

Further reading

 
 
 

Encyrtinae
Hymenoptera genera
Endemic fauna of Australia
Hymenoptera of Australia